Naa Asheley Dordor is a Ghanaian Chiropractor and Chief Executive Officer of Nova Wellness Centre, a health center that incorporates chiropractic, nutrition, exercise and massage to treat patients.

Career 
She is the chief executive officer of Nova Wellness Centre. Her career started as an associate chiropractor at chiropractor Glen Huntly, when she went on outreach programs. She worked for a year in Chicago Illinoi after graduating from school  before moving to Ghana. She further worked with a spinal clinic in Ghana for another one year before starting her own health center in 2013.

Education 
Dordor had her Bachelor of Science degree from the St Mary's University at Canada. She specialised  as a Chiropractor at the Palmer College of Chiropractic in Devenport Modalities in the USA.

Awards 
She won an award for Outstanding Executive of the Year (Health and Wellness Category) at the  third Ghana-West Africa Business Excellence Awards (GWABEA). In 2018, the 40under40 awards acknowledged her for her contribution to the Chiropractic industry in Ghana. She won Woman Entrepreneur of the year  in 2018 by the Small Medium Enterprises Ghana Awards (SMEGA) Scheme. In 2017, her health center, Nova Wellness Center, won the best Small & Medium Enterprises (SME) in health at the SMEGA Awards.

References 

Ghanaian chiropractors
21st-century Ghanaian businesswomen
21st-century Ghanaian businesspeople
Living people
Year of birth missing (living people)